Edward Albert "Eddie" Neloy (May 15, 1924 – May 26, 1971) was an American Thoroughbred racehorse trainer. At age fourteen, he began working at a racetrack then joined the United States Army during World War II. During the intense action in the Italian Campaign following Operation Shingle, Neloy was seriously wounded in Anzio and lost an eye.

When the war ended, Neloy returned to work in the horse racing industry and as a trainer in 1945 won the first race of a successful career that lasted until his death in 1971. In the mid-1950s he trained for Maine Chance Farm and in 1964 was voted the National Turf Writers Trainer of the Year following an outstanding season that included Gedney Farms' outstanding colt, Gun Bow.

In 1966, Eddie Neloy was chosen by the Phipps family to replace the retiring Bill Winfrey as their head trainer. Neloy was responsible for conditioning the horses of Gladys Mills Phipps' Wheatley Stable, those of her son, Ogden Phipps, and her grandson, Dinny Phipps. In his first year, Neloy met with outstanding success, including winning thirteen straight races with Buckpasser who was voted American Horse of the Year honors. During the five years he was with the Phipps family until his death in 1971, Neloy would be the U.S. leading money-winning trainer for 1966 through 1968 and the trainer of five Champions.

Eddie Neloy was training the two-year-old filly Numbered Account and had won the Fashion Stakes with her when he died suddenly of a heart attack in 1971. His accomplishments in Thoroughbred racing were recognized in 1983 when he was posthumously inducted in the United States' National Museum of Racing and Hall of Fame.

References

1924 births
1971 deaths
United States Army personnel of World War II
American horse trainers
United States Thoroughbred Racing Hall of Fame inductees
American people with disabilities